Jan Łoś (born 20 July 2000) is a retired Polish footballer who played as a forward. On 8 May 2018, he made his Ekstraklasa debut for Arka Gdynia, as his team defeated Cracovia 2–0.

References

External links
 
 

Polish footballers
Ekstraklasa players
2000 births
Living people
Arka Gdynia players
Association football forwards
Poland youth international footballers
Sportspeople from Gdynia